Michelle Yvonne Hunziker (Swiss , ; born 24 January 1977) is a Swiss-Italian television presenter and former model.

Early life
Hunziker was born in Sorengo, Lugano, in the Italian-speaking part of Switzerland. Her mother Ineke is Dutch and her father Rudolf, who died of a heart attack in 2001, was a German-speaking Swiss. He was a painter but worked as a hotel manager. In 1983, the family moved to Ostermundigen, a suburb of Bern in the German-speaking part of Switzerland. In Ostermundigen Hunziker attended elementary school. After moving to Milan with her mother, she became a fashion model and was hired by Riccardo Gay, an agent. At 17 she posed for Armani, Rocco Barocco, La Perla, Colmar, Fuerte Ventura, Lovable and Swish.

Career
As she was Eros Ramazzotti's fiancée, Hunziker was discovered by an Italian TV producer. In 1996, she presented the Rai Uno-show I cervelloni with Paolo Bonolis. In summer, she presented the prime time comedy show Paperissima Sprint (Canale 5) with Gabibbo. Because of her popularity, she hosted the afternoon show Colpo di Fulmine (Italia 1) in 1997. She attended the professional academy Music Art & Show in Milan with her choreographer Susanna Beltrami.

In 1998, the Italian film director Vincenzo Verdecchi offered Hunziker her first film role in the TV series La Forza dell'Amore (Canale 5). Afterwards she took the leading female role in Fammi stare sotto al letto. She was also in the documentary The Protagonist and in another film, Alex l'Ariete, where she acted with ex-skiing star Alberto Tomba. Hunziker and Pippo Baudo hosted the Canale 5 show La festa del Disco. From 1999 to 2001, she presented the late-night show Nonsolomoda (Canale 5) where she reported about fashion and lifestyle.

In 1999, TV3, the first Swiss private television station, was founded in Zürich, and Hunziker hosted a show called Cinderella, where a hair and make-up artist, as well as a styling adviser, helped both a celebrity and a viewer have a makeover. After the first episode, Hunziker was caught in the crossfire. The Swiss newspaper Blick even wrote: "Cinderella, TV3's new lifestyle show is not bad. It is catastrophic". Later, Hunziker was interviewed by the Swiss-German magazine Schweizer Illustrierte and said that she could not speak German anymore after having lived in Italy for many years. After TV3 had changed the concept, the show became more popular.

After hosting the Swiss show Cinderella, Hunziker was discovered by German TV producers. In 1998, she presented the Goldene Kamera awards show with Thomas Gottschalk (a very well-known presenter in Germany). A year later, she co-hosted the show Michael Jackson & Friends (ZDF) in Munich. After she had been on various talk shows, she presented her first in Germany: Erstes Glück (SWR/Das Erste). She co-hosted the show with Thomas Elstner and interviewed celebrities about their first love. The show was not very popular though and ultimately axed. 
When she returned to Italy, she presented the shows Donna sotto le stelle and Piazza di Spagna (Canale 5) with Gerry Scotti and Tacchi a spillo (Italia 1) with Claudio Lippi. In 2002–2004, Hunziker and Carsten Spengemann presented the first and second season of Deutschland sucht den Superstar, the German version of the British TV show Pop Idol.

Hunziker joined ZDF's Wetten, dass..?, Germany's most popular TV show in October 2009. The show was also syndicated live on the Austrian ORF and SF1 in her native Switzerland.

In 2006, she released an album in English, Lole, that was available only in German-speaking countries; the only single off the album was "From Noon Till Midnight".

Hunziker co-hosted the Italian comedy shows Zelig (Italia 1) and Scherzi a parte (Canale 5) in 2001. Zelig is one of the most famous Italian TV shows. Later that year, she received the Italian TV Oscar in the category "Discovery of the Year". She also co-hosted the Italian open-air music show Festivalbar with Daniele Bossari and Alessia Marcuzzi.

She has also starred in the musicals directed by Saverio Marconi The Sound of Music (playing the role of Maria von Trapp) and Cabaret (playing the role of Sally Bowles); both had huge success in Italy.

In 2007, Hunziker and Pippo Baudo hosted the Italian song contest, the Festival di Sanremo, on Rai Uno. Later, she co-hosted Striscia la notizia again with Ezio Greggio and Paperissima with Gerry Scotti.

In 2018, she hosted the Sanremo Music Festival on Rai 1 with Claudio Baglioni and Pierfrancesco Favino In 2020, she appeared in a video posted by Mimmo Modem, with the renowned neomelodic song by Niko Pandetta, Marco Calone and Pino Franzese called "Danza".

Personal life

She was married to Italian singer Eros Ramazzotti from 1998 to 2009 (separated since 2002, divorced 2009) and therefore also has Italian citizenship. They separated in 2002 and have one daughter together, Aurora Hunziker-Ramazzotti, also known as Aurora Ramazzotti, born on 5 December 1996. Hunziker announced her engagement to the Trussardi-heir Tomaso Trussardi in 2013, and together they have two daughters.

In 2017, Hunziker blamed a cult for her divorce from Ramazotti. She said that the cult tried to persuade her that he was a bad influence on her and to isolate her from her family. This statement caused an outcry in her homeland of Italy.

In 2021, she stated that she has distant Indonesian ancestry.

Filmography

Television programs

Notes

References

External links

1977 births
Living people
People from Sorengo
Italian television presenters
Italian film actresses
Italian stage actresses
Italian television actresses
Italian female models
Italian people of Swiss descent
Italian people of Dutch descent
Swiss emigrants to Italy
Swiss people of Dutch descent
Swiss-German people
Swiss female models
21st-century Italian singers
21st-century Italian women singers
People from Ostermundigen
Swiss women television presenters
Italian women television presenters
Naturalised citizens of Italy
Swiss people of Indonesian descent